Woodstock Times is a small weekly newspaper in Woodstock, New York that is circulated every Thursday.  It was established in 1972 by its current owner Geddy Sveikauskas of Ulster Publishing.

The editor is Brian Hollander.

References

External links
 Woodstock Times

Newspapers published in New York (state)
Mass media in Ulster County, New York
Woodstock, New York
Newspapers established in 1972
1972 establishments in New York (state)